TopDrawerSoccer.com (TDS) is an American soccer website that is dedicated to youth soccer in the United States. Specifically, the website focuses on Academy soccer, high school soccer, and college soccer in the United States. The website was launched by Robert Ziegler in 2003.

Profile and history 
The website was founded ahead of the 2003 college soccer season by Robert Ziegler who was looking to create a website dedicated to the collegiate game and youth soccer in the United States. Since then it has grown as one of the most prestigious youth and college soccer websites in the United States. It runs its own Top 100 youth soccer players nationally and regionally for both boys and girls soccer for all levels of the game.

Since 2011, the website has awarded the TopDrawerSoccer.com National Player of the Year Award which is awarded to the best men's and women's college soccer players for the season. It was first awarded following the 2011 NCAA Division I men's and women's seasons.

Now from 2011–present day the game of soccer has increased in popularity and skill level. Not only as the Womens National Soccer Team won the world cup but the Mens National Soccer team has qualified and done respectfully well in the tournament itself.
The USA offers a wide variety of opportunities to excel and progress your soccer game and skill. From recreational leagues, travel leagues, and college scholarship opportunities  to play college soccer.

The MLS league has also increased with popularity as each year it keeps expanding with more and more teams each year. And popular superstars have relocated to the United States to join and play in the respective league.
United States TV companies broadcast a lot more European, Australian, and other soccer leagues around the world.

Awards

National Player of the Year

The TopDrawerSoccer.com National Player of the Year Award is an annual award given by TopDrawerSoccer.com to the best men's and women's players in American college soccer. The award has been given annually since 2011. Since its inception, it has been considered one of the most prestigious individual awards to be given in college soccer.

Men's Award

Women's Award

Winners by school

National Freshman of the Year 
Since 2011, TopDrawerSoccer.com has named the national freshman of the year for both men's and women's soccer.

Men's and Women's Awards

References

External links
 

Association football websites
Companies based in Culver City, California
Soccer mass media in the United States
2003 establishments in California